Huddersfield Town's 1974–75 campaign saw Town relegated to the 4th Division for the first time in the club's history. Following Ian Greaves' resignation at the end of the previous season, Bobby Collins took charge at Leeds Road, but couldn't stop Town's alarming slide to Division 4. Town finished bottom of the table, 6 points from safety and 5 points from 2nd bottom team Watford.

Squad at the start of the season

Review
Following Ian Greaves' resignation at the end of the previous season, Town hired ex-Leeds United player and Scotland international Bobby Collins in his first managerial post. Following mid-table mediocrity the previous season, Town were hoping for a good start to mount a serious promotion challenge. But the start of the season saw Town lose 6 of their opening 8 league games. They then went on a 6-match unbeaten run, but that would be as good as it got for Town for the rest of the season. Even the 17 goals of Alan Gowling, the top scorer from the previous 2 seasons couldn't help Town's alarming slide.

In January 1975, ex-manager Tom Johnston was brought in as General Manager to help his fellow countryman, but even he couldn't change Town's fortunes as the team only won 4 out of their 22 games in 1975. Therefore, Town got relegated to Division 4 for the first time in their history. They also became the first team to win the 1st Division and play in the bottom tier of the Football League. They finished 24th with only 32 points, 5 behind Watford and Tranmere Rovers. 33 different players were used during the season, a record that would stand until the 1996–97 season.

Squad at the end of the season

Results

Division Three

FA Cup

Football League Cup

Appearances and goals

1974-75
English football clubs 1974–75 season